Owchunak (also Romanized as Owchūnak, Ochūnak, Oojoonak, Ūchainak, Ūchānak, Ūchīnak, and Ūchūnak) is a village in Jamabrud Rural District, in the Central District of Damavand County, Tehran Province, Iran. At the 2006 census, its population was 471, in 170 families.

References 

Populated places in Damavand County